BNY Mellon Center may refer to:
BNY Mellon Center at One Boston Place, Boston, Massachusetts
BNY Mellon Center (Philadelphia), Pennsylvania
BNY Mellon Center (Pittsburgh), Pennsylvania
Mellon National Bank Building, Pittsburgh, Pennsylvania

See also
Civic Arena (Pittsburgh), formerly the Mellon Arena